The following is a list of rulers of Monaco. Most belong to the House of Grimaldi; exceptions, which consist primarily of the principality's administrators under periods of foreign occupation, are noted.

History

The House of Grimaldi, descended from Otto Canella, a statesman from the Republic of Genoa, and taking their name from his son Grimaldo, were an ancient and prominent Guelphic Genoese family. Members of this family, in the course of the civil strife in Genoa between the Guelphs and Ghibellines, were banned from Genoa in 1271 and took refuge in Monaco.

François Grimaldi seized the Rock of Monaco in 1297, starting the Grimaldi dynasty, under the Genoese sovereignty. The Grimaldis acquired Menton in 1346 and Roquebrune in 1355, enlarging their possessions. These two towns (some 95% of the country's territory) were eventually ceded to France by the Franco-Monégasque Treaty in 1861.

The Grimaldis used the title of Lord until 1612. Then, Lord Honoré II started using the title of Prince, thereby becoming the first Prince of Monaco. Afterwards, Honoré II secured recognition of his independent sovereignty from Spain in 1633, and then from France by the Treaty of Péronne in 1641. Since then the area has remained under the control of the Grimaldi family to the present day, except when under French control from 24 February 1793 to 17 May 1814.

Rulers of Monaco

Timeline

See also

 Prince of Monaco
 Family tree of Monegasque monarchs
 Hereditary Prince of Monaco
 List of Monégasque consorts

References

 Burke's Royal Families of the World, Vol. 1: Europe and Latin America. London: Burke's Publishing Co., 1977. 
 
 

 
Monaco
Monaco
Monaco-related lists